August Starek (born 16 February 1945) is a former international Austrian footballer and football manager. He is also known as "Gustl Starek" and "der Schwarze Gustl" (German for "the black gustl").

External links
 
 
 Profile - Rapidarchiv 
 Profile -  Austria-Archiv 

Austrian footballers
Austria international footballers
1. Simmeringer SC players
SK Rapid Wien players
1. FC Nürnberg players
FC Bayern Munich footballers
LASK players
First Vienna FC players
Austrian Football Bundesliga players
Bundesliga players
Austrian football managers
FC Admira Wacker Mödling managers
FC Kärnten managers
FK Austria Wien managers
SK Sturm Graz managers
SK Rapid Wien managers
FC Red Bull Salzburg managers
1. FC Lokomotive Leipzig managers
Grazer AK managers
Austrian expatriate sportspeople in Germany
Austrian expatriate football managers
Expatriate football managers in Germany
Footballers from Vienna
1945 births
Living people
Association football midfielders
Austrian expatriate sportspeople in West Germany
Expatriate footballers in West Germany